THO complex subunit 5 homolog is a protein that in humans is encoded by the THOC5 gene. THOCs is a member of THO complex which is a subcomplex of the transcription/export complex (TREX). 

THOC5 is evolutionarily conserved in higher eukaryotes, however the exact roles of THOC5 in transcription and mRNA export are still unclear. THOC5 is phosphorylated by several protein kinases at multiple residues upon extracellular stimuli. These include stimulation with growth factors/cytokines/chemokines, or DNA damage reagents. Furthermore, THOC5 is a substrate for several oncogenic tyrosine kinases, suggesting that THOC5 may be involved in cancer development. 

Recent THOC5 knockout mouse data reveal that THOC5 is an essential element in the maintenance of stem cells and growth factor/cytokine-mediated differentiation/proliferation. Furthermore, depletion of THOC5 influences less than 1% of total mRNA export in the steady state, however it influences more than 90% of growth factor/cytokine induced genes. THOC5, thereby contributes to the 3′ processing and/or export of immediate-early genes induced by extracellular stimuli. These studies bring new insight into the link between the mRNA export complex and immediate-early gene response. The data from these studies also suggest that THOC5 may be a useful tool for studying stem cell biology, for modifying the differentiation processes and for cancer therapy.

References

Further reading

External links
THOC5 on biosignaling